Stevie Mikayne is a Canadian writer of mystery novels. She is a two-time Lambda Literary Award nominee in the Lesbian Mystery category, for UnCatholic Conduct at the 27th Lambda Literary Awards and for Illicit Artifacts at the 28th Lambda Literary Awards.

She has also published a series of children's books, Emlyn and the Gremlin, under the pen name Steff F. Kneff.

She lives in Ottawa with her partner Nancy and their daughter.

Works

as Stevie Mikayne
Jellicle Girl (2012)
Weight of Earth (2013)
UnCatholic Conduct (2014)
Illicit Artifacts (2015)

as Steff F. Kneff
Emlyn and the Gremlin (2014)
Emlyn and the Gremlin and the Barbeque Disaster (2014)
Emlyn and the Gremlin and the Mean Old Cat (2014)
Emlyn and the Gremlin and the Seaside Mishap (2015)
Emlyn and the Gremlin and the Teenage Sitter (2016)

References

External links

21st-century Canadian novelists
Canadian women novelists
Canadian mystery writers
Canadian children's writers
Canadian lesbian writers
Writers from Ottawa
Living people
Women mystery writers
21st-century Canadian women writers
Year of birth missing (living people)
21st-century Canadian LGBT people